Fully automated luxury communism may refer to:

 The term popularised by the British journalist Aaron Bastani
 Fully Automated Luxury Communism, a 2019 book by Bastani
 Post-scarcity economy, an organisation of society in which most goods are available to all